Barkul (Bo-Rukul) is a Plateau language of Barkul village, Bokkos LGA, Plateau State, Nigeria. The two dialects, Bo and Rukul, each with 500-1,000 speakers, are notably distinct. The classification of Barkul is unclear, but it appears to be closest to Fyam and Horom.

Ethnologue (22nd ed.) lists Barkul, Mabo, Mwa, and Richa villages in Bokkos LGA.

References

Languages of Nigeria
East Plateau languages